Naval Aviation Museum may refer to:
 National Museum of Naval Aviation in Florida, USA
 Canada Aviation and Space Museum in Ottawa, Canada
 Naval Aviation Museum (India) in Vasco da Gama, India
 Naval Aviation Museum (Argentina) in Buenos Aires, Argentina